Kampia is a village close to Almirida on the north west coast of the island of Crete, Greece. It is located in Apokoronas, Chania regional unit.

Populated places in Chania (regional unit)